Iraj Safdari (5 February 1939, Tehran, Iran – 23 June 2018, Tehran) was an Iranian Make-up Artist and Actor. He has three children.

Career
He started his career from 1954, when he was teenager at some famous theater in Tehran such as Pars, Nasr, Dehghan theater and later on Tehran Mosavar magazine. 
During these years working in theater as a makeup artist and actor, he met and worked with some famous and effective producers and theater owners such as Dr. Fathollah Vala (theater organization director of Iran), Dr. Shervan, Dr. Kooshan, Sarang, Nasrollah Mohtasham, Mahdi Raees Firooz. Later he worked on Barbod Society. 
He is known as one of the pioneers of makeup art in Iran. 

His first official job was on "Marg-e-Moosh" play, directed by Nosratollah Vahdat on 1954 at Nasr theater.
On movie industry on 1955 his first job as makeup artist was on Asemoon-jol movie directed be Nasrollah Vahdat 1955.

In early years after 1979 revolution of Iran, his wife "Fatemeh Jaferi" and his son assisted him on movies.
Recently his son Abdollah Safdari has entered the career independently.

Besides his main job, he has proficiency on movie title designing, sfx and some other items.

Filmography

Cinema

TV Series

Theater

Awards
 Nominated Crystalline Phoenix of Best Special Effect from 8th Fajr International Film Festival For Explorer (Jostejoogar in Local Language).
 Honorary Diploma & The Statue of Sardar e jangal Festival, For Mirza koochak Khan Movie 1983
 Special insignia of "Iranian Theater Forum on 5th ceremony of world theater day for lifetime art activities - 2008

Ennobled 
 Ennobled on the Iranian Alliance of Motion Picture Guilds (Khaneh Cinema (in Persian) 2nd Ceremony of Pioneers of Makeup Art - March 2006
 Ennobled on Theater Makeup Society of Iran as a Pioneer Makeup Artist 2008

Gallery

Iraj Safdari

Behind Scenes

References

External links

Iraj Safdari at the Soureh Cinema database (Persian)

1939 births
2018 deaths
Iranian make-up artists
People from Tehran
Special effects people